Krisztián Nagy (born 18 July 1995) is a Hungarian professional footballer who plays for Kecskemét.

Club career
In July 2021, Nagy signed with Kecskemét.

Club statistics

Updated to games played as of 14 March 2020.

References

External links

1995 births
Living people
People from Kaposvár
Hungarian footballers
Association football midfielders
Nagyatádi FC players
Kaposvári Rákóczi FC players
Kecskeméti TE players
Nemzeti Bajnokság I players
Nemzeti Bajnokság II players
Sportspeople from Somogy County